The Julia Morgan House is a Mediterranean Revival mansion, located in the Elmhurst neighborhood of Sacramento, California, constructed by Julia Morgan, the first woman licensed to practice architecture in California. The home, now listed on the National Register of Historic Places, was gifted to Sacramento State University by Charles Goethe after his death in 1966.

History
In 1918, Charles Goethe hired Julia Morgan to draw plans for the house. When Goethe died in 1966 he bequeathed the house along with his library, papers, and a large monetary donation to California State University, Sacramento. Since then, University Enterprises, Inc. has maintained it.

Recent history
In 1982 the house was added to the National Register of Historic Places due to its historic nature. Part of said historic nature is the fact that it is the only example of Morgan's domestic architecture in the Sacramento area. In 1999, the home was remodeled and its name was formally changed to the Julia Morgan House. In 2014, the house was remodeled to include business meeting and conference facilities. The house is currently used by the university to hold events by faculty or campus staff or can be rented for corporate and business meetings.

References

Julia Morgan buildings
Houses on the National Register of Historic Places in California
Houses completed in 1924
Mediterranean Revival architecture in California
Neoclassical architecture in California
Houses in Sacramento, California
California State University, Sacramento
National Register of Historic Places in Sacramento, California